Lynn Sanford Nance (born September 3, 1942) is an American former college basketball coach. He also served as head coach at Iowa State, Central Missouri State, Saint Mary's, Washington, and Southwest Baptist.

Early life and education
Nance was born in Granby, Missouri, where he graduated from Granby High School.

At Southwest Baptist Junior College (now University), Nance was a junior college All-American player before transferring to the University of Washington, where he became an honorable mention all-American. Nance went on to be selected in the fourth round of the 1965 NBA draft by the St. Louis Hawks. Unfortunately, a knee injury ended his professional career before he ever played a game for St. Louis.

Coaching career
Nance began his coaching career as head basketball coach at Versailles High School in Versailles, Missouri. He was freshman team coach at Washington in 1967–68. From 1968 to 1970, Nance was assistant varsity coach at Washington under Tex Winter before leaving to join the FBI.

In 1974, Nance returned to coaching basketball, as an assistant on Joe B. Hall's staff at Kentucky for two seasons.

From 1976 to 1980, Nance was head coach at Iowa State, during which Nance went 41–59. Following an 8–10 start to the season, Nance resigned from Iowa State on January 29, 1980. Iowa State reached a settlement to buy out the remaining two years on his contract, worth around $36,000.

Nance's next job was at Central Missouri State (now Central Missouri), an Division II where he was head coach from 1980 to 1985. Nance led Central Missouri State to a 29–3 record and national championship in the 1983–84 season.

Returning to the Division I level, Nance was an assistant coach at Fresno State in 1985–86. Nance again worked as a head coach from 1986 to 1989 at Saint Mary's College, going 61–27 with a school record 25 wins, West Coast Athletic Conference title, and NCAA tournament appearance in 1988–89.

Nance's final two head coaching jobs were at schools where he played college basketball. From 1989 to 1993, Nance was head coach at Washington, going 50–62. From 1996 to 1999, Nance was head coach at Southwest Baptist, going 36–42.

In 2010, Nance returned to coaching to serve as an assistant under Trent Johnson at LSU.

Outside of coaching
Aside from his career as a coach, Nance also served as a special agent for the FBI from 1970 to 1973. From 1973 to 1974, Nance was an investigator for the NCAA. Nance drew upon his experience as an FBI agent to write a novel titled Bridger: Deadly Peril.

In 1989, Nance spoke negatively about his former job as an NCAA investigator and said that NCAA rules "don’t take into consideration that some players’ parents don’t have money."

Head coaching record

(*) ISU finished the season 7–20, but was later awarded a win vacated by Oklahoma State.(**) Indicates record/standing at time of resignation from Iowa State.

References

1942 births
Living people
American men's basketball coaches
American men's basketball players
Basketball coaches from Missouri
Basketball players from Missouri
Central Missouri Mules basketball coaches
College men's basketball head coaches in the United States
Federal Bureau of Investigation agents
Fresno State Bulldogs men's basketball coaches
Iowa State Cyclones men's basketball coaches
Junior college men's basketball coaches in the United States
Kentucky Wildcats men's basketball coaches
LSU Tigers basketball coaches
Saint Mary's Gaels men's basketball coaches
Southwest Baptist Bearcats men's basketball players
St. Louis Hawks draft picks
Washington Huskies men's basketball coaches
Washington Huskies men's basketball players